Rajat Barmecha (born 24 April 1989) is an Indian actor who is best known for his lead role in the 2010 Bollywood film Udaan.

Childhood
Barmecha was born in Ladnun, Rajasthan, and grew up in Delhi. He attended Bal Bharati Public School, Brij Vihar. He has had a passion for acting since childhood. Though his father, Narendra Barmecha, is a Businessman, he supported Rajat to take up his dream. His mother Shanti Barmecha is a homemaker.

His sister Ritu Barmecha is also an actor and brother Vicky Barmecha is a Film Director who assisted Anurag Kashyap on Bombay Velvet.

Career
At 18 years of age, Rajat moved to Mumbai to pursue a career in jewellery designing but dropped the idea within a few days. He started his acting career by featuring in several commercials fr brands like Frooti, Sonata and Max New York life insurance.

At the age of 21, he made his debut in the film Udaan. His character a 17-year-old Rohan (played by Barmecha) who has been expelled from boarding school after being caught watching an adult film. He is forced to return home to an authoritarian father and a half-brother he had been unaware of. For his role in the film, he was nominated for a Screen Award for Most Promising Newcomer – Male. He then made a cameo appearance in Shaitan. He will next star in a film tentatively titled Leader which will be presented by Imtiaz Ali and directed by his associate Rajesh Tibrewal. The film is expected to release in 2018.

Barmecha is a known face when it comes to Web-series. He first appeared in a special appearance as Kartik in the web-series Girl In The City, with Mithila Palkar in 2016.

Filmography

References

External links 
 Rajat Barmecha on IMDb

Living people
Male actors from Delhi
Indian male film actors
Indian male voice actors
Male actors in Hindi cinema
1989 births
21st-century Indian male actors